The Argentine records in swimming are the fastest ever performances of swimmers from Argentina, which are recognised and ratified by Argentina's national swimming federation: CADDA (or C.A.D.D.A.). CADDA stands for la Confederación Argentina de Deportes Acuáticos—the Argentine Aquatic Sports Confederation.

All records were set in finals unless noted otherwise.

Long course (50 m)

Men

Women

Mixed relay

Short course (25 m)

Men

Women

Mixed relay

Notes

References
General
Argentine Records 4 October 2022 updated
Specific

External links
C.A.D.D.A. official website

Argentina
Records
Swimming records
Swimming